Andy Paterson is a British film producer and former second unit director. He is married to Olivia Hetreed. He was educated at Bolton School and Oriel College, Oxford.

Filmography
 Tigers (2014) (Screenplay)
The Railway Man (2013)
 Burning Man (2011)
 Incendiary (2008)
 Beyond the Sea (2004)
 Girl with a Pearl Earring (2003)
 Hilary and Jackie (1998)
 Restoration (1995)

References

External links
 

Living people
British film producers
People educated at Bolton School
Year of birth missing (living people)